The Maya Embedded Language (MEL) is a scripting language used to simplify tasks in the 3D graphics software Autodesk Maya. Most tasks that can be achieved through Maya's GUI can be achieved with MEL, as well as certain tasks that are not available from the GUI. MEL offers a method of speeding up complicated or repetitive tasks, as well as allowing users to redistribute a specific set of commands to others that may find it useful.

Design 

MEL is syntactically similar to Perl and Tcl. It provides some memory management and dynamic array-allocation, and offers direct access to functions specific to Maya. The majority of standard Maya commands are default MEL scripts, saved in the Maya Program Files directory.

MEL is fairly limited compared to mainstream scripting languages. It is primarily a language meant to journal the Maya session, so it lacks many advanced features such as associative arrays. Python was added to Maya as an alternative to MEL in Maya 8.5. Still MEL offers some advantages to Python:

 Discoverability of MEL is better since the built-in command echo server was created with MEL in mind.
 A lot of legacy code and inner working of Maya is in MEL form. This provides many insights into undocumented inner workings of Maya.

MEL is often criticized for its lack of programming features, and object orientation. In practice, however, MEL is used as a metaprogramming language where MEL just instructs Maya's node architecture to solve the problem. Since nodes form the actual computational core of Maya using a more robust readily apparent programming method would be a very inefficient approach. In many ways MEL complements the Maya API, with somewhat clear boundaries between allocated tasks. This makes MEL harder to learn and fully understand.

Uses 

The tools designed using MEL scripts generally come under the following categories:

Data I/O
Motion capture data import
Proprietary game data export
Scene meta-data for production tracking
Geometry creation and modification
Custom primitives
Third-party renderer specific data type (e.g., RenderMan sub-divisional surfaces)
Modeling tools not offered in the base package
Animation tools
Muscle simulators
Rigging and setting up controls
Crowd AI behavior
Lighting /rendering tools
Automatic creation of common complex shader setups
Pre- and post-render effects
Making calls to third-party renderers
Dynamics
Custom particle behavior
Simulated object emergent flocking and swarming
Genetic algorithms
Cloth simulation
File and folder scene setup and maintenance
User interface customization
Custom character controls
Removal of invalid Maya commands
Custom UIs

Example 

This is an example of a script which copies a selected object through its path:

// animated duplicates/instances script
proc animatedDuplication (int $rangeStart, int $rangeEnd, int $numOfDuplicates, int $duplicateOrInstance)
{
    int $range_start = $rangeStart;
    int $range_end = $rangeEnd;
    int $num_of_duplicates = $numOfDuplicates;
    int $step_size = ($range_end - $range_start) / $num_of_duplicates;
    int $i = 0;
    int $temp;

    currentTime $range_start;     // set to range start

    string $selectedObjects[];    // to store selected objects
    $selectedObjects = `ls -sl`;  // store selected objects
    select $selectedObjects;

    while ($i <= $num_of_duplicates)
    {
        $temp = $range_start + ($step_size * $i);
        currentTime ($temp);
        // selected the objects to duplicate or instance
        select $selectedObjects;
        if($duplicateOrInstance == 0)
        {
            duplicate;
        }
        else
        {
            instance;
        }
        $i++;
    }
}

 // Usage example:
 //  duplicate the current selection 5 times --
 //  evenly distributed between frame 1 and 240
 animatedDuplication(1, 240, 5, 0);

Features 

Maya also offers an expression language that is a super-set of MEL, and results in nodes that are executed as part of Maya's dependency graph. Expressions are developed with Maya's expression editor, and allow scripts to trigger while Maya evaluates the scene file at each change in time, to simulate complex behaviors or perform other useful tasks.

References 

 Mark R. Wilkins, Chris Kazmier: "MEL Scripting for Maya Animators". 2nd edition, Morgan Kaufmann 2005; 
 Pisca, Nicholas, "YSYT - Maya MEL Basics for Designers". 1st edition, 0001d Publishing 2009;

External links 

 

 MEL command reference (Maya 2013)
 MEL command reference (Maya 2014)
 MEL command reference (Maya 2015)
 MEL and Expressions - Autodesk Maya 2015 Help
 Mel Wiki
 Useful Scripts for Maya
 CGSociety - Maya Programming forum
 CGSociety - 'MEL scripts' thread
 CGSociety - 'Maya UI Building' thread
 MEL Scripting Tutorials for Maya - CreativeCrash
 variables in mel - ACCAD instructor Alan Price
 MEL video tutorials - lynda.com
 Digital Tutors search - MEL
 maya mel - polyextrude.com
 MEL - maya rigging wiki
 Mel Scripting - RobTheBloke
Scripting languages